The Supercopa de España de Baloncesto (English: Spanish Basketball Supercup) is a Spanish annual men's professional basketball competition. The competition is a super cup tournament.

History
The Supercopa was created in 1984 by the recently established Asociación de Clubs de Baloncesto (ACB) in which the league winner faces the cup winner in a single-game final. During its first four editions (1984–1987), the Supercup was also known as Federation Cup, as the tournament was jointly organized by the Spanish Basketball Federation (FEB), and it was held in the middle of the regular season. In 1988–89 season, the Supercup was not played for lack of competitive interest, and finally it was officially cancelled at the beginning of the 1989–90 season.

In 2004, almost two decades after its demise, ACB restored this classic tournament and renamed it Supercopa ACB (since 2011 known as Supercopa Endesa for sponsoring reasons). In order to achieve a higher competitive status, it was moved to the ACB pre-season and turned into a typical Final Four stage, including both the League and Cup winners from the previous season, the host team and the best qualified Spanish club in European competitions.

Format
Since 2004, four teams join the competition, played with a Final Four format the week before the start of the ACB season. During the Supercopa, a three-point shootout is also played between ACB players and, sometimes, players of the Spanish women's league or amateur players.

Selection criteria
Teams that take part in this competition are:

 Host team
 Liga ACB champion
 Copa del Rey champion
 Supercopa de España champion
 If vacancies exist, they will be awarded in the following order:
 Liga ACB runner-up
 Liga ACB third-placed team
 If a vacant continues existing, the best qualified at Liga ACB will get the spot.

Predecessors of Supercopa ACB

Finals by year

Titles by team in Supercopa ACB

Titles by team in predecessors of Supercopa ACB

References

External links
 Palmarés de la Supercopa Endesa 

 
1
Recurring sporting events established in 2004
Basketball supercup competitions in Europe